Dudi Sela was the defending champion but decided not to participate.

Tatsuma Ito won the title defeating John Millman in the final 6–4, 6–3.

This tournament featured the fastest serve ever recorded by Sam Groth at 263.4 km/h (163.4 mph).

Seeds

Draw

Finals

Top half

Bottom half

References
 Main Draw
 Qualifying Draw

Busan Open Challenger Tennis - Singles
2012 Singles